Jon Thomas may refer to:
 Jon T. Thomas (born 1967), United States Air Force general
 Jon R. Thomas (1946–2017), U.S. government official